The Gospel is a 2005 American Christian drama film directed and written by Rob Hardy. It was released in the United States by Screen Gems on October 7, 2005. The film retells the Parable of the Prodigal Son in a modern context.

Plot
David, a showbiz artist, performing in nightclubs in Los Angeles, learns that his father who is pastor of an evangelical church in Atlanta is sick, and decides to go home. He learns that Frank has become the second of his father, and that he is married to Charlene. Fred announces to his son that he has a prostate cancer. David gradually abandons his old life and begins to occupy an important position in the church, which will attract Frank's jealousy.

Cast
Boris Kodjoe as David "DT" Taylor
Idris Elba as Reverend Charles Frank
Clifton Powell as Bishop Fred Taylor
Nona Gaye as Charlene Taylor-Frank
Omar Gooding as Wesley
Tamyra Gray as Rain
China Anne McClain as Alexis
Donnie McClurkin as Minister Terrence Hunter
Aloma Wright as Ernesteine
Keshia Knight Pulliam as Maya Walker
Sierra Aylina McClain as Sue
Lauryn Alisa McClain as Anne
Hezekiah Walker as Brother Gordon
Michael J. Pagan as Young David

Cameo Appearances
Yolanda Adams as herself
Martha Munizzi as herself
Fred Hammond as himself
Kirk Franklin as himself

Soundtrack
The soundtrack features the following songs:

He Reigns (Kirk Franklin feat. Papa San)
Victory (Yolanda Adams)
Glorious (Martha Munizzi)
You Are Good (Greg Kirkland)
Still Alive (Kirk Franklin singers)
A Change Is Gonna Come (Deitrick Haddon)
Ooh Child (Urban Mix) (Donnie McClurkin feat. Kirk Franklin)
The Closer I Get to You (Donny Hathaway and Roberta Flack)
When I Pray (Interlude) (Joann Rosario)
All Things Are Working (Fred Hammond)
I Need You to Survive (Hezekiah Walker & the Love Fellowship Choir)
Now Behold the Lamb (Tamyra Gray, feat. Idris Elba Serman & Clifton Powell Parable)
Put Your Hands Together (Fred Hammond and Natalie Wilson)

Reception

Box office
Produced on a budget of US$4 million, The Gospel grossed $15.8 million at the North American box office, including $7.5 million from 969 theaters in its opening weekend.

Critical reception
According to the critic review aggregator site Rotten Tomatoes, The Gospel has an approval rating of 32% based on 37 reviews by film critics. The website's critics consensus reads, "While it features outstanding musical numbers, The Gospel reduces a series of worthy themes -- faith, family, forgiveness -- to soapy, banal clichés."

Accolades
The film received three nominations in the Black Reel Awards of 2006: Idris Elba was nominated for Best Actor, Nona Gaye was nominated for Best Actress, and Rob Hardy was nominated for Best Screenplay, Original or Adapted.

References

External links
 
 
 

Reviews
Music redeems confused 'Gospel', The Boston Globe, Ty Burr, October 7, 2005.
The Gospel (2005): A Church Welcomes Home a Wayward Son, New York Times, Laura Kern, October 7, 2005.
[http://www.sfgate.com/cgi-bin/article.cgi?f=/c/a/2005/10/10/DDG7SF4D4H1.DTL&type=movies Heavenly voices raise The Gospel'''s spirit], San Francisco Chronicle'', Walter Addiego, October 10, 2005.

2005 films
2005 drama films
African-American drama films
Films about evangelicalism
Films produced by Will Packer
Gospel music media
Screen Gems films
Rainforest Films films
2000s English-language films
2000s American films